Radoszyce or Radoshitz may refer to:

Radoszyce, Lower Silesian Voivodeship (south-west Poland)
Radoszyce, Podkarpackie Voivodeship (south-east Poland)
Radoszyce, Świętokrzyskie Voivodeship (south-central Poland)
Gmina Radoszyce, Końskie County, Świętokrzyskie Voivodeship, in south-central Poland
Radoshitz (Hasidic dynasty)